Robert Earl "Butterbean" Love (born December 8, 1942) is an American former professional basketball player who spent the prime of his career with the National Basketball Association's Chicago Bulls. A versatile forward who could shoot with either his left or right hand, Love now works as the Bulls' director of community affairs and goodwill ambassador.

High school and college career
After starring at Morehouse High School (now defunct) in Louisiana, Love played basketball for Southern University, where he also became a brother of Alpha Phi Omega. He earned All-America honors in 1963.

Professional career 
In 1965, the Cincinnati Royals selected the 6’8" forward in the fourth round of the 1965 NBA draft. Love failed to make the team, and instead spent the 1965–66 NBA season in the Eastern Basketball League.  After averaging over 25 points per game, Love earned the EBL Rookie of the Year Award and gained enough confidence to try out for the Royals once more. He made the team on his second attempt and played two seasons for the Royals, largely in a reserve role.  Love made his NBA debut on October 18, 1966. In 1968, the Milwaukee Bucks selected him in the NBA Expansion Draft and traded him to the Chicago Bulls in the middle of the 1968–69 season.

Love flourished while playing for Dick Motta's Bulls. In 1969–70, he became a full-time starter, averaging 21 points and 8.7 rebounds.  The following two seasons he averaged 25.2 and 25.8 points per game, appeared in his first two NBA All-Star Games, and earned All-NBA Second Team honors both seasons.  Love also appeared in the 1973 All-Star Game, and he would average at least 19 points and six rebounds every season until 1976–77.  Love was named to the NBA's All-Defense Second Team in 1974 and 1975.

His #10 jersey was the second jersey number to be retired by the Chicago Bulls. Jerry Sloan's #4 was the first. Love's 1995 wedding ceremony to Rachel Dixon took place at the United Center.

NBA career statistics

Regular season

|-
| align="left" | 1966–67
| align="left" | Cincinnati
| 66 || - || 16.3 || .429 || - || .633 || 3.9 || 0.7 || - || - || 6.7
|-
| align="left" | 1967–68
| align="left" | Cincinnati
| 72 || - || 14.8 || .424 || - || .684 || 2.9 || 0.8 || - || - || 6.4
|-
| align="left" | 1968–69
| align="left" | Milwaukee
| 14 || - || 16.2 || .368 || - || .763 || 4.6 || 0.2 || - || - || 7.6
|-
| align="left" | 1968–69
| align="left" | Chicago
| 35 || - || 9.0 || .416 || - || .724 || 2.5 || 0.4 || - || - || 5.1
|-
| align="left" | 1969–70
| align="left" | Chicago
| style="background:#cfecec;"| 82* || - || 38.1 || .466 || - || .842 || 8.7 || 1.8 || - || - || 21.0
|-
| align="left" | 1970–71
| align="left" | Chicago
| 81 || - || 43.0 || .447 || - || .829 || 8.5 || 2.3 || - || - || 25.2
|-
| align="left" | 1971–72
| align="left" | Chicago
| 79 || - || 39.3 || .442 || - || .784 || 6.6 || 1.6 || - || - || 25.8
|-
| align="left" | 1972–73
| align="left" | Chicago
| style="background:#cfecec;"| 82* || - || 37.0 || .431 || - || .824 || 6.5 || 1.5 || - || - || 23.1
|-
| align="left" | 1973–74
| align="left" | Chicago
| style="background:#cfecec;"| 82* || - || 40.1 || .417 || - || .818 || 6.0 || 1.6 || 1.0 || 0.3 || 21.8
|-
| align="left" | 1974–75
| align="left" | Chicago
| 61 || - || 39.4 || .429 || - || .830 || 6.3 || 1.7 || 1.0 || 0.2 || 22.0
|-
| align="left" | 1975–76
| align="left" | Chicago
| 76 || - || 37.1 || .390 || - || .801 || 6.7 || 1.9 || 0.8 || 0.1 || 19.1
|-
| align="left" | 1976–77
| align="left" | Chicago
| 14 || - || 35.4 || .338 || - || .761 || 5.2 || 1.6 || 0.6 || 0.1 || 12.2
|-
| align="left" | 1976–77
| align="left" | New York
| 13 || - || 17.5 || .462 || - || .846 || 2.9 || 0.3 || 0.1 || 0.2 || 10.1
|-
| align="left" | 1976–77
| align="left" | Seattle
| 32 || - || 14.1 || .372 || - || .872 || 2.7 || 0.7 || 0.4 || 0.1 || 4.1
|- class="sortbottom"
| style="text-align:center;" colspan="2"| Career
| 789 || - || 31.8 || .429 || - || .805 || 5.9 || 1.4 || 0.8 || 0.2 || 17.6
|}

Playoffs

|-
| align="left" | 1969–70
| align="left" | Chicago
| 5 || - || 34.4 || .385 || - || .792 || 9.2 || 0.8 || - || - || 11.8
|-
| align="left" | 1970–71
| align="left" | Chicago
| 7 || - || style="background:#cfecec;"| 47.1* || .491 || - || .806 || 7.3 || 1.4 || - || - || style="background:#cfecec;"| 26.7*
|-
| align="left" | 1971–72
| align="left" | Chicago
| 4 || - || 43.3 || .360 || - || .846 || 6.8 || 1.8 || - || - || 18.8
|-
| align="left" | 1972–73
| align="left" | Chicago
| 7 || - || 44.9 || .459 || - || .732 || 9.6 || 3.3 || - || - || 23.7
|-
| align="left" | 1973–74
| align="left" | Chicago
| 11 || - || 44.5 || .405 || - || .763 || 5.7 || 2.2 || 1.3 || 0.5 || 23.0
|-
| align="left" | 1974–75
| align="left" | Chicago
| 13 || - || 44.8 || .437 || - || .779 || 7.5 || 1.5 || 0.8 || 0.4 || 25.8
|- class="sortbottom"
| style="text-align:center;" colspan="2"| Career
| 47 || - || 43.9 || .431 || - || .776 || 7.5 || 1.9 || 1.0 || 0.4 || 22.9
|}

Executive career

Love ended his NBA career with the Bulls after spending parts of the 1976–77 season in New York and Seattle. He would finish with career totals of 13,895 points, 1,123 assists, and 4,653 rebounds. Love developed a stutter in childhood, and some say it prevented him from finding meaningful employment after his playing days were over. At one point, Love was hired as a busboy and dishwasher by Nordstrom where he earned $4.45 an hour.  Eventually, John Nordstrom, the director of the family business, was so impressed with the former NBA star's work ethic, he offered to pay for speech therapy classes. Nordstrom later promoted Love to be the corporate spokesperson. In 1993, Love returned to the Chicago Bulls as their director of community relations. One of his duties in this position involves regularly speaking to school children. Love has also become a motivational speaker.

Bibliography 

 The Bob Love Story: If It's Gonna Be, It's Up to Me, in 1999.

References

External links

Bob Love NBA career statistics
Chicago Bulls: Bob Love, Former Stutterer article and video at Sterling Speakers website
Bio of Bob Love at AEI Speakers

1942 births
Living people
21st-century African-American people
20th-century African-American sportspeople
African-American basketball players
American men's basketball players
American motivational speakers
Basketball players from Louisiana
Basketball players from Chicago
Chicago Bulls players
Cincinnati Royals draft picks
Cincinnati Royals players
Milwaukee Bucks expansion draft picks
Milwaukee Bucks players
National Basketball Association All-Stars
National Basketball Association players with retired numbers
New York Nets players
People from Bastrop, Louisiana
Seattle SuperSonics players
Small forwards
Southern Jaguars basketball players